Almenno San Salvatore (Bergamasque:  or simply ) is a comune (municipality) in the Province of Bergamo in the Italian region Lombardy, located about  northeast of Milan and about  northwest of Bergamo.

Almenno San Salvatore borders the following municipalities: Almè, Almenno San Bartolomeo, Paladina, Strozza, Ubiale Clanezzo, Villa d'Almè.

Sights include the Santuario della Madonna del Castello, with paintings by Andrea Previtali and Gian Paolo Cavagna, the annexed the  Pieve di Lemine, with 10th-century frescoes, and the Romanesque church of San Giorgio. The  Rotonda di San Tomè is also located nearby.

References

External links
 Official website